Kosovo–North Macedonia relations are diplomatic relations between the Republic of Kosovo and the Republic of North Macedonia.

Diplomatic relations
Informal relations started on 9 October 2008 when Macedonia recognised Kosovo after its declaration of independence from Serbia on 17 February of the same year. In October 2009, Kosovo signed an agreement to re-adjust its border with Macedonia by exchanging some lands. On 17 October 2009, Skopje and Pristina officially established diplomatic relations. On 12 November 2009, Macedonia upgraded its Liaison Office in Pristina to an Embassy and an Ambassador was appointed. Kosovan Embassy in Albania was initially accredited to North Macedonia  until an embassy was opened in Skopje.

Travel

North Macedonia recognised the Kosovan passport on 12 July 2008 prior to full diplomatic recognition of the Republic of Kosovo. Citizens of the Republic of Kosovo can stay 90 days visa free in North Macedonia. Citizens of North Macedonia can stay in the Republic of Kosovo for 90 days visa free also.

History

Before the recognition, the President Branko Crvenkovski said "The Republic of Macedonia will decide its view when we deem it most appropriate for our interests. [The Republic of Macedonia] would follow the position of NATO and the European Union on Kosovo, but nations in the two organisations have to yet to assume a common stance." The Democratic Party of Albanians left the government coalition on 13 March 2008 after it failed to meet their six demands, recognising Kosovo's independence being one of them. However, it returned on 24 March 2008 after demanding the recognition of Kosovo. On 27 March 2008, Minister of Foreign Affairs of Macedonia Antonio Milošoski issued the following statement: "In welcoming the constructive position of the Republic of Macedonia concerning Kosovo, the Commission on Foreign Affairs of the European Parliament has expressed concern because of delay in the technical demarcation of the Republic of Macedonia-Kosovo borderline and has asked that this issue be solved in accordance with the Ahtisaari proposal." This reiterated Macedonia's support for the Ahtisaari plan for Kosovo, which was endorsed by the foreign affairs ministry a year earlier, on 30 March 2007. On 10 July, Foreign Ministry spokesman Petar Culev announced that Macedonia will accept new Kosovan passports. Ali Ahmeti, leader of the ethnic Albanian Democratic Union for Integration party, said Macedonia would recognise Kosovo after problems over the border demarcation were resolved. (The Democratic Union for Integration is a member of the governing coalition; however, Ahmeti has no role as minister in the government.) North Macedonia has -long border with Kosovo. On 12 May 2009 Gjorge Ivanov became the new president of Macedonia. Soon after his inauguration Ivanov invited the president of Kosovo Fatmir Sejdiu to be the first statesman to visit Macedonia in his mandate, but Sejdiu cancelled his visit to Macedonia, because the visit was planned to be a non-formal meeting. The Kosovan side expected a full official meeting between two statesmen. The following weeks saw something of a crisis in the relations of the two countries. There were even speculations that Macedonia might revert its decision to recognise Kosovo as an independent state. However, Skopje officially denied that it wants to revert the recognition of Kosovo. Relations were normalised soon at a regional meeting.

Bilateral relations between the two neighbouring countries were assessed as good, while the Albanians living in North Macedonia are considered to be a strong connecting bridge with Kosovo. In December 2021, President of the Republic of North Macedonia, Stevo Pendarovski, visited Kosovo. It was the first time a president of this neighboring country visited Kosovo on an official visit. In March 2022, Speaker of the Parliament of North Macedonia, Talat Xhaferi, stated at a meeting with President of the Republic of Kosovo, Vjosa Osmani, in Pristina, that North Macedonia unreservedly supports Kosovo's membership in NATO, the Council of Europe and other international organizations.

See also 
 Foreign relations of Kosovo
 Foreign relations of North Macedonia
 North Macedonia–Serbia relations

Notes and references
Notes:

References:

Kosovo–North Macedonia relations
Bilateral relations of Kosovo
Bilateral relations of North Macedonia